Nazar may refer to:

Places
 Nazar-e Bala, a village in Iran
 Nazar-e Pain, a village in Iran
 Nazar, Navarre, a municipality in the province of Navarre, Spain

Film and television
 Nazar the Brave, a 1940 Soviet comedy film directed by Amasi Martirosyan
 Nazar (1991 film), a Bollywood film directed by Mani Kaul
 Nazar (2005 film), a Bollywood film starring Meera and Ashmit Patel
 Nazar (TV series) a 2018 Indian television series

Music
 Nazar (band), a Turkish band that entered the Eurovision Song Contest 1978
 Nazar (musician), Angolan electronic musician
 Nazar (rapper) (born 1984), Austrian rapper
 Nazar (album), a 2015 album released by Joe Chawki and Hodge Gjonbalaj

Others
 Nazar (amulet), an amulet of stone or glass which is believed to protect against evil eye
 Nazar (comedian) (died 20 January 1992), Pakistani comedian, film actor
 Nazar (given name), a masculine given name
 Nazar, a subterranean fictional planet in Ludvig Holberg's 1741 novel Niels Klim's Underground Travels

See also
 
 Nazir (disambiguation)
 Nizar (disambiguation)